Margot Rhys (1914 – 21 June 1996) was an Australian actress best known for her lead roles in two films from Charles Chauvel, Heritage (1935) and Uncvilised (1936).

Rhys was born Kathleen Margot Rhys-Jones in South Yarra, Melbourne. She also worked as a model. She was married after making Uncivilised and appears to have retired.

Stage credits
Fair Exchange – August, 1933
Wedding Morning – September 1933

Filmography
Heritage (1935)
Uncvilised (1936)

References

External links
 at IMDb

1914 births
1996 deaths
Australian film actresses
Australian female models
Actresses from Melbourne